The Network Control Center Data System (NCCDS) is an element of NASA's Space Network (SN) ground segment. Collocated with the White Sands Tracking and Data Relay Satellite System, the NCCDS is the operations control facility for the network. It schedules most Space Network elements and supporting elements and provides interfaces for planning, acquisition, control, and status of the Space Network. The NCCDS is the point-of-contact between customers (who have satellites in orbit) and the Space Network for most scheduling and real-time performance. A customer may obtain Space Network support by submitting specific schedule requests to or establishing generic requirements with the NCCDS. The NCCDS translates customers’ requirements into specific TDRS communications and tracking events. Additionally, the NCCDS notifies affected customers of scheduled system outages so that Mission Operation Centers (MOCs) can properly plan mission activities. Upon MOC request, the NCCDS provides operational performance information (such as data presence monitoring indicators and data quality monitoring data) on scheduled services during actual support to determine if conditions exist that will affect data quality.

The NCCDS issues Network Advisory Messages (NAMs) to provide up-to-date information on network conditions and constraints. These messages are accessible via the NCCDS active NAM web site. The Goddard Space Flight Center uses the NAMs as a means of letting customers know of any performance constraints associated with the TDRS spacecraft.

References
 Space Network User's Guide (SNUG), 450-SNUG, Rev 9.

Goddard Space Flight Center